Ematheudes tunesiella is a species of snout moth in the genus Ematheudes. It was described Ragonot in 1892, and was described from Tunisia, from which its species epithet is derived. It is also found in Italy.

References

Moths described in 1892
Anerastiini
Moths of Europe